Sang My Thang is Toshinori Yonekura's 13th original studio album. The album came three years after his last full-length original album, Roots Of Style. All songs appearing on the album are written and composed by Yonekura and the album was executively produced by pop singer and collaborator, Maki Ohguro.

Track list

Personnel 
 Toshinori Yonekura - Vocals, background vocals
 Kiyoshi Kamada - Drums
 Kitaro Nakamura - Electric bass
 Yoichiro Kakizaki - Alto guitar, electric guitar
 Takashi Numazawa - Drums
 Hiroshi Sawasa - Electric bass
 Gen Ohgimi - Percussion
 Gen Ittetsu Strings - Strings
 Big Horns Bee - Horns
 Butcher Asano - Electric guitar
 Obawo Nakajima - Percussion
 Futoshi Kobayashi - Trumpet, flugelhorn
 Ray - Double bass
 Koji Orita - Alto sax
 Wakaba Kawai - Trombone
 Shiro Sasaki - Trumpet

Production 
 Executive Producer - Maki Oguro
 Producer - Toshinori Yonekura
 Co-Producer - Kiyoshi Yoshihara, Kazunori Ito
 Vocal arrangement - Toshinori Yonkeura
 Programming - Yoichiro Kakizaki, Shingo Sato
 Recording & Mixing - Toy-knock, Yuji Kuraishi
 Mastering - Harb Powers Jr.
 Art Direction - Koh Sasaki
 Styling - Shuhei Yomo, Hiromi Shibata
 Hair & Make-Up - Satoshi Hirata
 Photography - Takayuki Okada
 Body Painting & Illustration - Hidekichi Shigemoto

Charts 

Album - Oricon Sales Chart (Japan)

References 

Toshinori Yonekura albums
2005 albums